{{Infobox settlement

| name                    = Ollagüe
| other_name              =
| settlement_type         = Commune
| image_skyline           = Ollagüe, Chile, 2016-02-09, DD 73.JPG
| image_alt               = Ollagüe
| image_caption           = Ollagüe
| image_flag              =
| flag_alt                = Flag
| image_shield            = Escudo de Ollagüe.svg
| shield_alt              = Coat of arms
| motto                   = Ilustre Municipalidad de Ollagüe, El Loa - Chile.Soberanía, ProgresoIllustrious Municipality of Ollagüe, El Loa - ChileSovereignty, Progress
| image_map               = Comuna de Ollagüe.svg
| map_alt                 = Map of Ollagüe in Antofagasta Region
| map_caption             = Map of Ollagüe in Antofagasta Region
| pushpin_map             = Chile
| pushpin_map_narrow = yes
| pushpin_label_position  = bottom
| pushpin_map_alt         = Location in Chile
| pushpin_map_caption     = Location in Chile
| coordinates             = 
| coor_pinpoint           = 
| coordinates_footnotes   = 
| subdivision_type        = Country
| subdivision_name        = 
| subdivision_type1       = Region
| subdivision_name1       = 
| subdivision_type2       = Province
| subdivision_name2       = El Loa
| established_title       = Founded
| established_date        = 1979
| extinct_title           =
| extinct_date            =
| founder                 =
| named_for               =
| government_footnotes    = 
| government_type         = Municipal council
| leader_party            = UDI
| leader_title            = Alcalde
| leader_name             = Carlos Reygadas Bavestrello
| unit_pref               = Metric
| area_footnotes          = 
| area_total_km2          = 2963.9
| elevation_footnotes     = 
| elevation_m             = 3703
| population_footnotes    = 
| population_total        = 199
| population_as_of        = 2012 Census
| population_density_km2  = auto
| population_demonym      = 
| population_blank1_title = Urban
| population_blank1       = 0
| population_blank2_title = Rural
| population_blank2       = 318
| demographics_type1      = Sex
| demographics1_footnotes =  
| demographics1_title1    = Men
| demographics1_info1     = 210
| demographics1_title2    = Women
| demographics1_info2     = 108
| timezone = CLT
| utc_offset = -4
| timezone_DST = CLST
| utc_offset_DST = -3
| postal_code_type        = 
| postal_code             =
| area_code_type          = 
| area_code               = (+56) 5
| website                 = Municipalidad de Ollagüe
| footnotes               =
}}

Ollagüe is a Chilean frontier village and commune in El Loa Province, Antofagasta Region.

The commune is in the Andean altiplano, bordering with Bolivia. It also includes the localities of Cebollar, Ascotán, Amincha, El Inca, Coska, Puquios, and Chela.

"Ollagüe" (Pronounced: oh-YA-gweh, is the hispanicized spelling of Ullawi (Aymara ullaña to see, to look at, to watch, wi'' a nominalizing suffix to indicate a place, "viewpoint").

Demographics
According to the 2002 census of the National Statistics Institute, Ollagüe had 318 inhabitants (210 men and 108 women). Of these,  (0%) lived in urban areas and 318 (100%) in rural areas. The population fell by 28.2% (125 persons) between the 1992 and 2002 censuses.

Administration
As a commune, Ollagüe is a third-level administrative division of Chile administered by a municipal council, headed by an alcalde who is directly elected every four years.

Within the electoral divisions of Chile, Ollagüe is represented in the Chamber of Deputies by Marcos Espinosa (PRSD) and Felipe Ward (UDI) as part of the third electoral district, (together with Tocopilla, María Elena, Calama and San Pedro de Atacama). The commune is represented in the Senate by Carlos Cantero Ojeda (Ind.) and José Antonio Gómez Urrutia (PRSD) as part of the second senatorial constituency (Antofagasta Region).

Nearby Attractions
Nearby attractions include:
Ollagüe volcano
Aucanquilcha volcano
Salar de Ascotán
Salar de Carcote

References

External links
OpenStreetMap - Ollagüe
Official website
Mineros del Alto Cielo: Historical Archaeology Project
Ollagüe Google Maps

Populated places established in 1979
Communes of Chile
Populated places in El Loa Province
1979 establishments in Chile